Smithville-Sanders is a census-designated place (CDP) encompassing the communities of Smithville and Sanders in Monroe County, Indiana, United States. Its population was 3,184 as of the 2010 census.

Geography

Demographics

References

Census-designated places in Indiana
Census-designated places in Monroe County, Indiana